Jonathan Sutherland (born 1977) is a Scottish television and radio presenter and producer, currently the main presenter of BBC Scotland's Sunday night Sportscene on BBC One Scotland. He occasionally hosts the Sportscene Results show on Saturday afternoons and regularly appears on Reporting Scotland.

Education
Sutherland was born in Brae in the Shetland Islands. He left the islands to study politics at Aberdeen University and subsequently graduated with his degree in 1999 before landing a job at BBC Radio Shetland.

Early career
His first taste of journalism was with Radio Shetland, but he left in 2003 to build his career. He was hired by BBC Sport as a broadcast journalist but left the BBC briefly for a spell to take up the role of Deputy Editor at the Shetland Weekly newspaper. He returned to the BBC soon after to work on various productions as a freelancer before landing the job of assistant producer of Sportscene.

Presenting career

Jonathan is the main presenter of the Sunday night SPFL highlights show, Sportscene. He is also a regular presenter of Sportsound on BBC Radio Scotland.

Jonathan is one of two Shetlanders working for BBC Scotland sport, the other being Phil Goodlad, who is from Yell.

Personal life

Jonathan lives in Glasgow with his wife, the BBC Alba presenter, Siobhan Macinnes.

He has a son from a previous marriage, and a son from his current relationship.

References 

Living people
Scottish television presenters
Alumni of the University of Aberdeen
People from Shetland
BBC sports presenters and reporters
1977 births